Swingler is a surname. Notable people with the surname include:

 Jay Swingler (born 1995), British YouTuber
 Lewis Ossie Swingler ( 1905–1962), African-American journalist, newspaper editor, and publisher
 Randall Swingler (1909–1967), British poet
 Stephen Swingler (1915–1969), British politician, MP and government minister

See also
 Swindler (surname)